Martha Ruth Brooks (born July 15, 1944) is a Canadian writer of plays, novels, and short fiction. Her young adult novel True Confessions of a Heartless Girl won the Governor General's Award for English language children's literature in 2002.

Winnipeg-based Brooks was born and raised on the grounds of the Manitoba Sanatorium in Ninette, Manitoba, where her father was a thoracic surgeon and her mother a nurse.

Brooks is also a jazz singer and her album Change of Heart won the Prairie Music Award for outstanding jazz album in 2002.

Her books have received numerous awards including the Governor General's Award, the Vicky Metcalf Award, Mr. Christie Book Award, the Ruth Schwartz Award, the Canadian Library Association Young Adult Book Award, and the McNally Robinson Book for Young People Award.

Works
 Paradise Cafe and other stories, 1988.
 Two Moons in August, 1991
 Travelling on into the Light and Other Stories, 1994
 I Met a Bully on the Hill, 1995
 Andrew's Tree, 1996
 Bone Dance, 1997
 Being with Henry, 1999 
 True Confessions of a Heartless Girl, 2002
 Mistik Lake, 2007
 Queen of Hearts, 2010

References

Other sources
Donald, Bridget. "The Many Voices of Martha Brooks," 'Quill and Quire' June 1999. Retrieved May 4, 2010.

External links

 

1944 births
Living people
Canadian children's writers
Canadian women jazz singers
Writers from Manitoba
Canadian women children's writers
Governor General's Award-winning children's writers